Jamni is a village in Pillukhera Tehsil in Jind District of Haryana State, India. It belongs to Hisar Division. It is located 20 km towards the east from district headquarters Jind. 3 km from Pillukhera. 178 km from State capital Chandigarh. Jamni's Pin code is 126113 and postal head office is Pillukhera.

Villages near Jamni are Dhatrath (4 km), Taloda (4 km), Kalwa (5 km), Pilu Khera (5 km), Pillukhera (5 km). Jamni is surrounded by Alewa Tehsil towards the north, Safidon Tehsil towards the east, Jind Tehsil towards the west, Assandh Tehsil towards the North. Jind, Safidon, Assandh, Gohana are the nearby cities to Jamni.

Demographics
About 4000 people live in Jamni. Haryanvi dialect is spoken here. People from Bairagi (Swami),Brahmin,Saini and Jat are almost equal in number. Other caste people are also found.

Transport
Pillukhera Railway Station, Siwaha Railway Station are the nearby railway stations to Jamni. However Panipat Jn Railway Station is major railway station 51 km near to Jamni. The village is on the bank of hansi branch canal.  It is connected by road to Safidon and Bibipur.

Education
There are several colleges near Jamni: K.m.govt. College, Dav Poltechnical College, Sir Chotu Ram Polytechnic College, Govt.P. G. College and Government College.  There is a secondary school in Jamni, G. H. S. Jamni.  There is an animal husbandry school in the village.

References

External links

Villages in Jind district